The Border Patrol Tactical Unit (BORTAC) is the tactical unit of the United States Border Patrol. In 2007, BORTAC was placed under the command of the newly formed Special Operations Group (SOG) together with the Border Patrol Search, Trauma, and Rescue Unit (BORSTAR).

Mission
The mission of BORTAC is "to respond to terrorist threats of all types anywhere in the world in order to protect our nation's homeland." In essence, BORTAC teams often conduct drug raids on high value targets, as well as sometimes being attached to Border Patrol or Air and Marine Operations units to assist them in their duties. BORTAC does not only conduct operations on the U.S. border. BORTAC teams are often used to provide a tactical federal law enforcement capability across the country, helping with security for events such as the Super Bowl, as well as being deployed to natural disaster areas to ensure that civil unrest does not break out. Additionally, BORTAC teams can be called upon to assist local law enforcement in high-profile events such as the 1992 Los Angeles riots, where they were part of the 1,000 riot-trained federal special agents sent in an attempt to end the rioting in the Los Angeles region; and the 2015 Clinton Correctional Facility escape, where a BORTAC team inserted by helicopter shot and killed escaped prisoner Richard Matt. BORTAC has been assigned to operate in sanctuary cities to increase immigration enforcement. Finally, BORTAC teams can sometimes be deployed overseas to assist and train countries in drug enforcement and border security techniques.

History
The unit was first formed in 1984 to deal with disturbances occurring within Immigration and Naturalization Service detention facilities, but this mission is now handled by the U.S. Immigration & Customs Enforcement (ICE), Enforcement & Removal Operations (ERO), Special Response Teams (SRT). Since its inception BORTAC has steadily expanded its scope and mission capabilities, and is now a rapid response unit capable of executing both foreign and national level domestic operations. BORTAC members have operated in 28 countries around the world. Missions have included international training/advisory functions, counter terrorism operations, counter narcotics operations, high-risk warrant service, dignitary protection, interdiction & patrol operations, and tactical training to other U.S. agencies and military units.

Operations

In the 1980s, BORTAC worked with the Drug Enforcement Administration conducting counter narcotics operations in South America during Operation Snowcap. In April 2000, the BORTAC conducted Operation Reunion, in which it executed a raid on a home in Miami, Florida, and safely returned Cuban refugee Elian Gonzalez to his family in Cuba.

Following 9/11, BORTAC personnel were sent to high-risk areas around the country to help secure against future attacks. In 2002, BORTAC worked jointly with the United States Secret Service securing sports venues at the Winter Olympics in Salt Lake City. BORTAC personnel have assisted in natural disaster tactical relief operations by providing hurricane relief aid to Gulf Coast residents and law enforcement support to law enforcement agencies affected by Hurricane Katrina. In December 2010, BORTAC Agent Brian Terry was killed while pursuing members of a gang that operated along the border of Mexico and Arizona.

In 2020, the White House deployed 100 agents including BORTAC to sanctuary cities including Atlanta, Boston, Chicago, Detroit, Houston, Los Angeles, Newark, New Orleans, New York, and San Francisco for three months to assist Immigration and Customs Enforcement (ICE) agents and act as a show of force. ICE's acting director Matthew Albence said this was being done as sanctuary city policies cause an increase in crime. This was disputed by former Customs and Border Protection commissioner Gil Kerlikowske.

In 2020, as part of the Protecting American Communities Task Force, BORTAC was deployed during the George Floyd protests in Portland, Oregon, which sparked criticism from Governor Kate Brown and others as well as a lawsuit claiming the agency engaged in unlawful detainment, arbitrarily picking up people in Portland streets in unmarked vehicles who were too far away from federal buildings to be considered a credible threat.

In 2022, during the Robb Elementary School shooting in Uvalde, Texas, the Del Rio sector field office nearby deployed BORTAC to help assist the local authorities. Arriving an hour after the beginning of the shooting, they ended the massacre by breaching the classroom where the suspect was barricaded and neutralized him. One BORTAC officer was grazed in the head by a bullet during a shootout.

Organization
BORTAC headquarters is co-located with its training unit at Biggs Army Airfield, within Fort Bliss U.S. Army base in El Paso, Texas. The BORTAC training unit is currently responsible for conducting all CBP tactical team training. In addition, the unit also provides specialist training to other Federal, state and local law enforcement agencies. As part of a joint Department of State/ Department of Justice training program, BORTAC has also provided tactical team and counter narcotics training to several foreign governments police, paramilitary, tactical, drug, and specialist units, including the El Salvador National Police's Grupo de Respuesta Policial (GRP) tactical unit.

Uniforms
BORTAC Personnel wear a variety of uniforms while conducting operations. These include desert khaki or foliage colored two-piece flight suits, as well as combat uniforms in foliage, desert khaki, and Multicam. Because of the increasing prevalence of smugglers wearing camouflage, BORTAC personnel will often, when operating in conjunction with Border Patrol or CBP Air and Marine Operations, wear similar uniforms to those of the unit with which they are operating. BORTAC Personnel also commonly wear plate carriers and, on occasion, ballistic helmets to protect them in the course of their operations. Most of their uniforms and gear are fire resistant, a result of their operations often taking place in conjunction with CBP Air and Marine Operations.

See also
 Border Patrol, Search, Trauma and Rescue (BORSTAR)
 Hostage Rescue Team

References

External links

 Fact Sheet (PDF)
 Specwar.net article

Non-military counterterrorist organizations
United States Border Patrol
United States Department of Homeland Security
1984 establishments in the United States